The 2003–04 Chicago Blackhawks season was the 78th season of operation of the Chicago Blackhawks in the National Hockey League. The Blackhawks missed the playoffs for the second consecutive season.

Offseason

Regular season
General manager Mike Smith was fired on October 24, 2003. Bob Pulford replaced Smith on an interim basis until a replacement could be found.

On December 11, 2003, Mark Bell scored just 15 seconds into the overtime period to give the Blackhawks a 4–3 home win over the Detroit Red Wings. The Sabres' Derek Roy would match that mark in the overtime period on March 17, 2004, in a 4–3 Buffalo road win over the Atlanta Thrashers. Both goals would prove to be the fastest overtime goals scored during the 2003–04 NHL regular season. In February, team captain Alexei Zhamnov was traded to the Philadelphia Flyers. The team chose not to name a replacement for the rest of the season.

Final standings

Schedule and results

|- align="center" bgcolor="#CCFFCC" 
|1||W||October 8, 2003||1–0 || align="left"|  Minnesota Wild (2003–04) ||1–0–0–0 || 
|- align="center" bgcolor="#FFBBBB"
|2||L||October 10, 2003||0–5 || align="left"| @ Colorado Avalanche (2003–04) ||1–1–0–0 || 
|- align="center" bgcolor="#FFBBBB"
|3||L||October 12, 2003||2–4 || align="left"|  Los Angeles Kings (2003–04) ||1–2–0–0 || 
|- align="center" bgcolor="#FFBBBB"
|4||L||October 16, 2003||1–2 || align="left"| @ Columbus Blue Jackets (2003–04) ||1–3–0–0 || 
|- align="center" bgcolor="#FFBBBB"
|5||L||October 18, 2003||2–7 || align="left"| @ Atlanta Thrashers (2003–04) ||1–4–0–0 || 
|- align="center" bgcolor="#CCFFCC" 
|6||W||October 19, 2003||3–1 || align="left"|  Nashville Predators (2003–04) ||2–4–0–0 || 
|- align="center" 
|7||T||October 23, 2003||3–3 OT|| align="left"| @ San Jose Sharks (2003–04) ||2–4–1–0 || 
|- align="center" bgcolor="#CCFFCC" 
|8||W||October 25, 2003||3–2 || align="left"| @ Los Angeles Kings (2003–04) ||3–4–1–0 || 
|- align="center" 
|9||T||October 26, 2003||1–1 OT|| align="left"| @ Mighty Ducks of Anaheim (2003–04) ||3–4–2–0 || 
|- align="center" 
|10||T||October 28, 2003||2–2 OT|| align="left"| @ Phoenix Coyotes (2003–04) ||3–4–3–0 || 
|- align="center" bgcolor="#FFBBBB"
|11||L||October 30, 2003||0–1 || align="left"|  Pittsburgh Penguins (2003–04) ||3–5–3–0 || 
|-

|- align="center" bgcolor="#CCFFCC" 
|12||W||November 1, 2003||3–2 || align="left"| @ St. Louis Blues (2003–04) ||4–5–3–0 || 
|- align="center" bgcolor="#CCFFCC" 
|13||W||November 2, 2003||3–1 || align="left"|  Mighty Ducks of Anaheim (2003–04) ||5–5–3–0 || 
|- align="center" bgcolor="#CCFFCC" 
|14||W||November 7, 2003||2–1 || align="left"| @ Nashville Predators (2003–04) ||6–5–3–0 || 
|- align="center" bgcolor="#FF6F6F"
|15||OTL||November 9, 2003||3–4 OT|| align="left"|  Colorado Avalanche (2003–04) ||6–5–3–1 || 
|- align="center" bgcolor="#FFBBBB"
|16||L||November 10, 2003||0–3 || align="left"| @ Detroit Red Wings (2003–04) ||6–6–3–1 || 
|- align="center" bgcolor="#FFBBBB"
|17||L||November 12, 2003||2–6 || align="left"|  Calgary Flames (2003–04) ||6–7–3–1 || 
|- align="center" bgcolor="#FF6F6F"
|18||OTL||November 14, 2003||3–4 OT|| align="left"|  Detroit Red Wings (2003–04) ||6–7–3–2 || 
|- align="center" 
|19||T||November 16, 2003||2–2 OT|| align="left"|  New York Rangers (2003–04) ||6–7–4–2 || 
|- align="center" bgcolor="#FFBBBB"
|20||L||November 18, 2003||2–5 || align="left"| @ Edmonton Oilers (2003–04) ||6–8–4–2 || 
|- align="center" bgcolor="#FF6F6F"
|21||OTL||November 20, 2003||2–3 OT|| align="left"| @ Vancouver Canucks (2003–04) ||6–8–4–3 || 
|- align="center" bgcolor="#FFBBBB"
|22||L||November 22, 2003||1–2 || align="left"| @ Calgary Flames (2003–04) ||6–9–4–3 || 
|- align="center" bgcolor="#FFBBBB"
|23||L||November 26, 2003||2–3 || align="left"| @ San Jose Sharks (2003–04) ||6–10–4–3 || 
|- align="center" bgcolor="#FFBBBB"
|24||L||November 28, 2003||3–4 || align="left"| @ Mighty Ducks of Anaheim (2003–04) ||6–11–4–3 || 
|- align="center" bgcolor="#FFBBBB"
|25||L||November 29, 2003||1–3 || align="left"| @ Los Angeles Kings (2003–04) ||6–12–4–3 || 
|-

|- align="center" bgcolor="#FFBBBB"
|26||L||December 3, 2003||2–3 || align="left"|  Buffalo Sabres (2003–04) ||6–13–4–3 || 
|- align="center" bgcolor="#FFBBBB"
|27||L||December 6, 2003||2–5 || align="left"| @ New York Islanders (2003–04) ||6–14–4–3 || 
|- align="center" 
|28||T||December 7, 2003||2–2 OT|| align="left"|  Phoenix Coyotes (2003–04) ||6–14–5–3 || 
|- align="center" bgcolor="#CCFFCC" 
|29||W||December 11, 2003||4–3 OT|| align="left"|  Detroit Red Wings (2003–04) ||7–14–5–3 || 
|- align="center" bgcolor="#FFBBBB"
|30||L||December 12, 2003||0–1 || align="left"| @ Dallas Stars (2003–04) ||7–15–5–3 || 
|- align="center" 
|31||T||December 14, 2003||1–1 OT|| align="left"|  Dallas Stars (2003–04) ||7–15–6–3 || 
|- align="center" bgcolor="#FFBBBB"
|32||L||December 18, 2003||1–6 || align="left"| @ Ottawa Senators (2003–04) ||7–16–6–3 || 
|- align="center" bgcolor="#FFBBBB"
|33||L||December 19, 2003||2–3 || align="left"| @ Detroit Red Wings (2003–04) ||7–17–6–3 || 
|- align="center" 
|34||T||December 21, 2003||2–2 OT|| align="left"|  New Jersey Devils (2003–04) ||7–17–7–3 || 
|- align="center" bgcolor="#CCFFCC" 
|35||W||December 23, 2003||3–0 || align="left"|  St. Louis Blues (2003–04) ||8–17–7–3 || 
|- align="center" bgcolor="#FFBBBB"
|36||L||December 26, 2003||1–4 || align="left"|  Columbus Blue Jackets (2003–04) ||8–18–7–3 || 
|- align="center" bgcolor="#CCFFCC" 
|37||W||December 28, 2003||3–0 || align="left"|  Detroit Red Wings (2003–04) ||9–18–7–3 || 
|- align="center" bgcolor="#FFBBBB"
|38||L||December 29, 2003||0–1 || align="left"| @ Pittsburgh Penguins (2003–04) ||9–19–7–3 || 
|- align="center" bgcolor="#FF6F6F"
|39||OTL||December 31, 2003||3–4 OT|| align="left"|  Vancouver Canucks (2003–04) ||9–19–7–4 || 
|-

|- align="center" bgcolor="#CCFFCC" 
|40||W||January 2, 2004||2–1 || align="left"|  San Jose Sharks (2003–04) ||10–19–7–4 || 
|- align="center" bgcolor="#FFBBBB"
|41||L||January 4, 2004||3–4 || align="left"|  Edmonton Oilers (2003–04) ||10–20–7–4 || 
|- align="center" bgcolor="#FFBBBB"
|42||L||January 7, 2004||4–7 || align="left"| @ Minnesota Wild (2003–04) ||10–21–7–4 || 
|- align="center" bgcolor="#CCFFCC" 
|43||W||January 8, 2004||3–1 || align="left"|  Calgary Flames (2003–04) ||11–21–7–4 || 
|- align="center" bgcolor="#FF6F6F"
|44||OTL||January 11, 2004||4–5 OT|| align="left"|  Colorado Avalanche (2003–04) ||11–21–7–5 || 
|- align="center" bgcolor="#FFBBBB"
|45||L||January 12, 2004||4–7 || align="left"| @ St. Louis Blues (2003–04) ||11–22–7–5 || 
|- align="center" bgcolor="#FFBBBB"
|46||L||January 14, 2004||2–4 || align="left"| @ Detroit Red Wings (2003–04) ||11–23–7–5 || 
|- align="center" bgcolor="#FFBBBB"
|47||L||January 18, 2004||1–2 || align="left"|  Los Angeles Kings (2003–04) ||11–24–7–5 || 
|- align="center" bgcolor="#FFBBBB"
|48||L||January 21, 2004||2–4 || align="left"| @ Minnesota Wild (2003–04) ||11–25–7–5 || 
|- align="center" bgcolor="#CCFFCC" 
|49||W||January 22, 2004||7–0 || align="left"|  Columbus Blue Jackets (2003–04) ||12–25–7–5 || 
|- align="center" bgcolor="#FFBBBB"
|50||L||January 24, 2004||3–4 || align="left"| @ Columbus Blue Jackets (2003–04) ||12–26–7–5 || 
|- align="center" bgcolor="#FFBBBB"
|51||L||January 27, 2004||2–3 || align="left"| @ Vancouver Canucks (2003–04) ||12–27–7–5 || 
|- align="center" bgcolor="#FFBBBB"
|52||L||January 29, 2004||2–5 || align="left"| @ Edmonton Oilers (2003–04) ||12–28–7–5 || 
|- align="center" bgcolor="#CCFFCC" 
|53||W||January 30, 2004||5–3 || align="left"| @ Calgary Flames (2003–04) ||13–28–7–5 || 
|-

|- align="center" bgcolor="#FFBBBB"
|54||L||February 1, 2004||4–6 || align="left"| @ Montreal Canadiens (2003–04) ||13–29–7–5 || 
|- align="center" bgcolor="#CCFFCC" 
|55||W||February 3, 2004||4–1 || align="left"| @ Toronto Maple Leafs (2003–04) ||14–29–7–5 || 
|- align="center" bgcolor="#CCFFCC" 
|56||W||February 11, 2004||5–2 || align="left"|  Nashville Predators (2003–04) ||15–29–7–5 || 
|- align="center" bgcolor="#CCFFCC" 
|57||W||February 14, 2004||2–1 OT|| align="left"|  Boston Bruins (2003–04) ||16–29–7–5 || 
|- align="center" bgcolor="#FFBBBB"
|58||L||February 15, 2004||0–4 || align="left"|  Washington Capitals (2003–04) ||16–30–7–5 || 
|- align="center" bgcolor="#FFBBBB"
|59||L||February 19, 2004||3–6 || align="left"|  San Jose Sharks (2003–04) ||16–31–7–5 || 
|- align="center" bgcolor="#CCFFCC" 
|60||W||February 22, 2004||3–2 OT|| align="left"|  St. Louis Blues (2003–04) ||17–31–7–5 || 
|- align="center" bgcolor="#FFBBBB"
|61||L||February 24, 2004||1–3 || align="left"| @ Philadelphia Flyers (2003–04) ||17–32–7–5 || 
|- align="center" bgcolor="#CCFFCC" 
|62||W||February 25, 2004||4–3 || align="left"| @ Columbus Blue Jackets (2003–04) ||18–32–7–5 || 
|- align="center" bgcolor="#FFBBBB"
|63||L||February 27, 2004||3–4 || align="left"|  Columbus Blue Jackets (2003–04) ||18–33–7–5 || 
|- align="center" 
|64||T||February 29, 2004||2–2 OT|| align="left"|  Florida Panthers (2003–04) ||18–33–8–5 || 
|-

|- align="center" 
|65||T||March 1, 2004||2–2 OT|| align="left"| @ Nashville Predators (2003–04) ||18–33–9–5 || 
|- align="center" bgcolor="#FFBBBB"
|66||L||March 3, 2004||3–5 || align="left"|  Tampa Bay Lightning (2003–04) ||18–34–9–5 || 
|- align="center" bgcolor="#FFBBBB"
|67||L||March 5, 2004||2–5 || align="left"|  Mighty Ducks of Anaheim (2003–04) ||18–35–9–5 || 
|- align="center" bgcolor="#FF6F6F"
|68||OTL||March 7, 2004||3–4 OT|| align="left"|  Edmonton Oilers (2003–04) ||18–35–9–6 || 
|- align="center" bgcolor="#FFBBBB"
|69||L||March 11, 2004||4–6 || align="left"| @ New Jersey Devils (2003–04) ||18–36–9–6 || 
|- align="center" bgcolor="#CCFFCC" 
|70||W||March 12, 2004||4–3 || align="left"| @ Washington Capitals (2003–04) ||19–36–9–6 || 
|- align="center" bgcolor="#FFBBBB"
|71||L||March 14, 2004||0–4 || align="left"|  Dallas Stars (2003–04) ||19–37–9–6 || 
|- align="center" bgcolor="#FFBBBB"
|72||L||March 17, 2004||2–3 || align="left"|  Carolina Hurricanes (2003–04) ||19–38–9–6 || 
|- align="center" bgcolor="#CCFFCC" 
|73||W||March 19, 2004||4–3 OT|| align="left"|  Vancouver Canucks (2003–04) ||20–38–9–6 || 
|- align="center" 
|74||T||March 21, 2004||2–2 OT|| align="left"|  Phoenix Coyotes (2003–04) ||20–38–10–6 || 
|- align="center" 
|75||T||March 23, 2004||2–2 OT|| align="left"| @ Colorado Avalanche (2003–04) ||20–38–11–6 || 
|- align="center" bgcolor="#FFBBBB"
|76||L||March 25, 2004||2–8 || align="left"|  Minnesota Wild (2003–04) ||20–39–11–6 || 
|- align="center" bgcolor="#FF6F6F"
|77||OTL||March 27, 2004||3–4 OT|| align="left"| @ St. Louis Blues (2003–04) ||20–39–11–7 || 
|- align="center" bgcolor="#FFBBBB"
|78||L||March 28, 2004||1–3 || align="left"|  St. Louis Blues (2003–04) ||20–40–11–7 || 
|- align="center" bgcolor="#FFBBBB"
|79||L||March 30, 2004||2–5 || align="left"| @ Nashville Predators (2003–04) ||20–41–11–7 || 
|-

|- align="center" bgcolor="#FFBBBB"
|80||L||April 1, 2004||1–3 || align="left"|  Nashville Predators (2003–04) ||20–42–11–7 || 
|- align="center" bgcolor="#FF6F6F"
|81||L||April 3, 2004||1–2 OT|| align="left"| @ Phoenix Coyotes (2003–04) ||20–42–11–8 || 
|- align="center" bgcolor="#FFBBBB"
|82||L||April 4, 2004||2–5 || align="left"| @ Dallas Stars (2003–04) ||20–43–11–8 || 
|-

|-
| Legend:

Player statistics

Scoring
 Position abbreviations: C = Center; D = Defense; G = Goaltender; LW = Left Wing; RW = Right Wing
  = Joined team via a transaction (e.g., trade, waivers, signing) during the season. Stats reflect time with the Blackhawks only.
  = Left team via a transaction (e.g., trade, waivers, release) during the season. Stats reflect time with the Blackhawks only.

Goaltending
  = Joined team via a transaction (e.g., trade, waivers, signing) during the season. Stats reflect time with the Blackhawks only.

Awards and records

Awards

Transactions
The Blackhawks were involved in the following transactions from June 10, 2003, the day after the deciding game of the 2003 Stanley Cup Finals, through June 7, 2004, the day of the deciding game of the 2004 Stanley Cup Finals.

Trades

Players acquired

Players lost

Signings

Draft picks
Chicago's draft picks at the 2003 NHL Entry Draft held at the Gaylord Entertainment Center in Nashville, Tennessee.

See also
2003–04 NHL season

Notes

References

 
 

Chic
Chic
Chicago Blackhawks seasons
Chic
Chic